Séamus Power may refer to:

 Séamus Power (Waterford hurler) (born 1930), Irish hurler for Mount Sion and Waterford
 Séamus Power (Tipperary hurler) (born 1952), Irish hurler for Boherlahan-Dualla and Tipperary
 Séamus Power (golfer) (born 1987), Irish professional golfer